The 2021 Central Pulse season saw the Central Pulse netball team compete in the 2021 ANZ Premiership. The 2021 season saw Gail Parata replace Yvette McCausland-Durie as Pulse's head coach. However, Parata would be replaced by a returning McCausland-Durie after just one season. The team was captained by Claire Kersten. Pulse finished the regular season in 5th place and did not qualify for the Final Series.

Players

Player movements

2021 roster

 

Notes
  Ameliaranne Ekenasio was initially named as captain. However she subsequently missed the entire season. She was rested for the Otaki tournament, then went on medical leave due to fatigue and then became pregnant. She was replaced as captain by Claire Kersten.

Pre-season

Otaki tournament
Central Pulse hosted the official ANZ Premiership tournament at Te Wānanga o Raukawa in Otaki between 26 and 28 March. All six ANZ Premiership teams took part. Earlier in March, Pulse played friendlies against Waikato Bay of Plenty Magic, Southern Steel and Mainland Tactix.

Regular season

Fixtures and results
Round 1

Round 2

Round 3
 
Round 4

Round 5
 
Round 6

Round 7
 
Round 8

Round 9

Round 10 

Round 11

Round 12

Round 13

 
Round 14

Round 15

Notes
  Pulse's Round 11 match against Mainland Tactix was postponed after a change in COVID-19 alert levels. The match was rescheduled for Friday, 9 July.

Final standings

References

2021
2021 ANZ Premiership season
2021 in New Zealand netball